Robert John Ritson (1 August 1936 – 20 July 2013) was an Australian politician. He was a Liberal member of the South Australian Legislative Council from 1979 to 1993.

References

1936 births
2013 deaths
Liberal Party of Australia members of the Parliament of South Australia
Members of the South Australian Legislative Council
Place of birth missing